Finland competed at the 2020 Summer Olympics in Tokyo. Originally scheduled to take place from 24 July to 9 August 2020, the Games were postponed to 23 July to 8 August 2021, because of the COVID-19 pandemic. Finnish athletes have appeared in every edition of the Summer Olympic Games since the nation's official debut in 1908.

Medalists

Competitors
The following is the list of number of competitors in the Games.

Archery

One Finnish archer directly qualified for the men's individual recurve at the Games by reaching the quarterfinal stage and obtaining one of seven available spots at the 2021 Final Qualification Tournament in Paris, France.

Athletics

Finnish athletes further achieved the entry standards, either by qualifying time or by world ranking, in the following track and field events (up to a maximum of 3 athletes in each event):

Track and road events
Men

Women

Field events
Men

Women

Combined event – Women's heptathlon

Badminton

Finland entered one male badminton player into the Olympic tournament. Kalle Koljonen, the 2021 European Championships bronze medalists, secured a spot at the Games after finished 28th in the BWF World Race to Tokyo Rankings. Airi Mikkelä who qualified to compete at the Games in the women's singles declined the invitation after she has decided to retire in July 2020.

Boxing

Finland entered one female boxer into the Olympic tournament. Mira Potkonen in the women's lightweight)qualified by topping the list of eligible boxers from Europe in her weight division of the IOC's Boxing Task Force Rankings.

Equestrian

Finland entered one dressage rider into the Olympic equestrian competition, by finishing in the top two, outside the group selection, of the individual FEI Olympic Rankings for Group A (North Western Europe).

Dressage

Qualification Legend: Q = Qualified for the final; q = Qualified for the final as a lucky loser

Golf

Finland entered two male and two female golfers into the Olympic tournament.

Sailing

Finnish sailors qualified one boat in each of the following classes through the 2018 Sailing World Championships, the class-associated Worlds, and the continental regattas.

On 12 December 2019, windsurfer and London 2012 silver medalist Tuuli Petäjä-Sirén and Rio 2016 Laser sailor Kaarle Tapper were officially nominated to the Finnish roster for the Games, with two-time Olympian Tuula Tenkanen (women's Laser Radial) joining the squad more than a year later. Nacra 17 sailors Sinem Kurtbay and Akseli Keskinen completed the lineup on April 21, 2021, as the former's original partner Janne Järvinen handed a prison sentence for money laundering and drug offenses.

M = Medal race; EL = Eliminated – did not advance into the medal race

Shooting

Finnish shooters achieved quota places for the following events by virtue of their best finishes at the 2018 ISSF World Championships, the 2019 ISSF World Cup series, European Championships or Games, and European Qualifying Tournament, as long as they obtained a minimum qualifying score (MQS) by 31 May 2020.

Skateboarding

Finland entered one skateboarder into the Olympic tournament. Lizzie Armanto was automatically selected among the top 16 eligible skateboarders in the women's park based on the World Skate Olympic Rankings of June 30, 2021.

Swimming 

Finnish swimmers achieved qualifying standards in the following events (up to a maximum of 2 swimmers in each event at the Olympic Qualifying Time (OQT), and potentially 1 at the Olympic Selection Time (OST)):

On 12 December 2019, breaststroke swimmer and 2013 world bronze medalist Matti Mattsson was officially nominated to the Finnish roster for his third consecutive Games, with rookie Ida Hulkko (women's 100 m breaststroke) and eventual European champion Ari-Pekka Liukkonen (men's 50 m freestyle) achieving the A-standard to join Mattsson in the pool for the rescheduled Games.

Wrestling

Finland qualified two wrestlers for each of the following classes into the Olympic competition. One of them granted an Olympic license by advancing to the top two finals of the men's Greco-Roman 97 kg at the 2021 European Qualification Tournament in Budapest, Hungary, while another Finnish wrestler claimed one of the remaining slots in the men's Greco-Roman 130 kg at the 2021 World Qualification Tournament in Sofia, Bulgaria.

Greco-Roman

See also
 Finland at the 2020 Summer Paralympics

References

Nations at the 2020 Summer Olympics
2020
Olympics